Rebekka Guðleifsdóttir (born  1978) is a photographer from Iceland who was named the "Web's Top Photographer" by the Wall Street Journal on 29 July 2006.

Biography
She lived in Gainesville, Florida from age 4 to age 11. She currently lives in Hafnarfjörður, near Reykjavík, Iceland. Her Flickr images led to her creating and appearing in a Toyota advertising campaign.

Her posted images at Flickr were copyrighted, but then sold by a third party without her consent. "Only Dreemin" sold 60 prints, of seven of her photos, for more than £2,500. She protested by putting up a photo at Flickr named "Only Dreemin" and had text telling of the illegal sale, but Flickr removed it saying users cannot "harass, abuse, impersonate, or intimidate others". Since then, the thread was put back online by Flickr and Guðleifsdóttir received an official apology.

In 2014 her book Moodscapes was published. It details the art of capturing fine art landscape photography, and features images in her signature style including some self-portraits.

References

External links
Rebekka Gudleifsdóttir at Flickr

1978 births
Living people
21st-century Icelandic women artists
21st-century women photographers
Internet fraud
Internet celebrities
Rebekka Gundleifsdottir
Rebekka Gundleifsdottir
People from Gainesville, Florida
Icelandic expatriates in the United States
Rebekka Gundleifsdottir